Anugraheethan Antony (English: Blessed Antony) is a 2021 Indian Malayalam-language romantic comedy fantasy film directed by director Prince Joy in his directorial debut. It stars Sunny Wayne and Gouri G. Kishan in lead roles with Siddique, Indrans, Suraj Venjaramoodu and Baiju Santhosh in the supporting roles and also a dog with equal prominence. The film is produced by M. Shijith, under the banner of Lekshya Entertainments.

Plot

The film starts with the death of a man, Antony, whose ghost watches over the funeral proceedings. His father's pet dog Rony is the only one who can see him, and he is unable to talk to or touch anyone else who is alive. On the first day following his death, he meets Antappan, an alcoholic who dies before cashing in his winning lottery ticket. Antony stays with Antappan on his last day as Antappan's family finds the ticket, and Antappan reveals that spirits will only be on the earth for 7 days.

The film then moves into a flashback, where Antony is an engineering drop out and has a photo studio of his own. Fed up with his son's antics, Antony's father, a retired schoolteacher, decides to buy 2 pet dogs, RUBY and RONY, to give him company – much to Antony's annoyance. Antony sells RUBY to another man without his father's permission. Meanwhile, Antony meets and falls in love with a girl named Sanjana, who seems to reciprocate his love. But just before confessing his love to her, he meets with an accident and dies.

Now his spirit wishes to convey the news of his death and his love for her, but is unable to do so. As he struggles to figure out a way to get this news to Sanjana, RONY faithfully keeps him company and follows him around. Eventually, on his 7th and last day, RONY brings a flyer announcing Antony's death to Sanjana, successfully revealing to her that he is dead. She visits his house and realizes his true love for her, thus fulfilling Antony's last wish. At the very end, Antony finds RUBY, who reunites with RONY. Together they return to his house to keep Antony's grieving father company, and look up at a star in the night sky who is implied to be Antony.

Cast

Production

Filming
Principal photography began in Jan 2019 in Thodupuzha with a pooja function in the presence of Midhun Manuel Thomas. Filming was completed on 2 August 2019.

Soundtrack 

The song is composed by Arun Muraleedharan on Malayalam, lyrics by Manu Manjith. The soundtrack album was distributed by Muzik247.

Track listing

Release
The movie was released in theatres on 1 April 2021. It had only a limited theatrical run due to Covid - 19 Second Wave In India. The film started Streaming on Amazon Prime Video from July 23. It was premiered on  Mazhavil Manorama  on 8th August at 5.00pm.

References

External links
 
 
 

2021 films
2020s Malayalam-language films
Indian drama films
Films scored by Arun Muraleedharan